Bob Bryan and Mike Bryan were the defending champions, but lost to Robert Lindstedt and Daniel Nestor in the quarterfinals.

Seeds
All seeds receive a bye into the second round.

Draw

Finals

Top half

Bottom half

References

2013 ATP World Tour
Men's Doubles